The streak-throated woodpecker (Picus xanthopygaeus) is a species of woodpecker found in the Indian subcontinent.

Description
A medium-sized, green woodpecker with streaked throat and scaly whitish underparts. Green above with yellowish rump, white supercilia and white and black moustache. Crown red in male, blackish in female. Tail dark and plain. Small, dark bill.

References

Images

External links

streak-throated woodpecker
Birds of South Asia
Birds of Southeast Asia
streak-throated woodpecker
streak-throated woodpecker
streak-throated woodpecker